Elster is a village and a former municipality in Saxony-Anhalt, Germany located in Wittenberg district. Since 1 January 2011, it is part of the town Zahna-Elster. From 2005 until 2011 it belonged to the administrative municipality (Verwaltungsgemeinschaft) of Elbaue-Fläming, before 2005 it belonged to the administrative community of Elster-Seyda-Klöden.

Geography and transport
The community lies about 15 km east of Wittenberg and 10 km west of Jessen. Through the community runs the Federal Highway (Bundesstraße) B 187 and the railway line between Wittenberg and Cottbus.

It lies at the mouth of the Black Elster, where it empties into the Elbe. The International Bicycle Trail R2 runs through Elster along the Elbe. A reaction ferry is still used here for crossing the river. Scenically charming are the Elbauen, which at high water work as natural polders. During the so-called Flood of the Century in 2006, these natural polders were not high enough to keep the water back, leading to a great deal of the community being flooded.

Moreover, in 2004, a new landing stage was dedicated where Elbe cruise ships now stop.

History

Elster had its first documentary mention in 1187 under the name Alstermunde. Until sometime before the Second World War, it was an important shipping and fishing community. Nowadays, the biggest employers are agriculture and small handicraft businesses.

Subdivisions
Elster consists of Iserbegka, Gielsdorf, Meltendorf, and Elster

References

External links

Elster/Elbe The Community of Elster
Elbe-Elster Tourism Association
regionalverein-jessen.de

Former municipalities in Saxony-Anhalt
Zahna-Elster